The Bishop of Wrexham is the Ordinary of the Roman Catholic Diocese of Wrexham in the Province of Cardiff in Wales.

The see is in the city of Wrexham where the bishop's seat is located at the Cathedral Church of Our Lady of Sorrows.

The diocese was erected on 12 February 1987 from the Diocese of Menevia. The current bishop is the Right Reverend Peter Brignall, the 3rd Bishop of Wrexham.

List of the Bishops of Wrexham

References

External links
GCatholic.org

Post-Reformation Roman Catholic bishops in Wales
Roman Catholic Diocese of Wrexham

de:Bistum Wrexham
it:Diocesi di Wrexham